Bridge Lake is an unincorporated recreational community located at the eastern end of Bridge Lake in the Interlakes District of the South Cariboo region of the Interior of British Columbia, Canada.  Its centre is the small Bridge Lake General Store. The bigger Interlakes community, 15 km to the west, is the largest service centre on the Interlakes Highway.  Nearby is Bridge Lake Provincial Park.

Climate

References

BCGNIS listing "Bridge Lake (lake)"

Unincorporated settlements in British Columbia
Geography of the Cariboo
Populated places in the Cariboo Regional District